The Secret is a 2006 self-help book by Rhonda Byrne, based on the earlier film of the same name. It is based on the belief of the pseudoscientific law of attraction, which claims that thoughts can change a person's life directly. The book alleges energy as assurance of its effectiveness. The book has sold 30 million copies worldwide and has been translated into 50 languages. Scientific claims made in the book have been rejected by a range of critics, pointing out that the book has no scientific foundation.

Background
The Secret was released as a film in March 2006, and later the same year as a book. The book is influenced by Wallace Wattles' 1910 book, The Science of Getting Rich, which Byrne received from her daughter during a time of personal trauma, in 2004. New York Times bestselling authors of The Passion Test, Janet Bray Attwood and Chris Attwood, are not featured in the film or the book, but arranged 36 of the 52 interviews for the film, many of which are referenced in the book.

The book served as the basis for the 2020 film The Secret: Dare to Dream.

Synopsis
Byrne re-introduces a notion originally popularized by persons such as Madame Blavatsky and Norman Vincent Peale that thinking about certain things will make them appear in one's life. Byrne provides examples of historical persons who have allegedly achieved this. Byrne cites a three-step process: ask, believe, and receive.  This is based on a quotation from the Bible's Matthew 21:22: "And all things, whatsoever ye shall ask in prayer, believing, ye shall receive."

Byrne highlights the importance of gratitude and visualization in achieving one's desires, along with alleged examples. Later chapters describe how to improve one's prosperity, relationships, and health, with more general thoughts about the universe.

Reception

Gross
The book has been translated into 50 languages and has sold over 30 million copies. Due partly to an appearance on The Oprah Winfrey Show, the book and film had grossed $300 million in sales by 2009.  Byrne has subsequently released Secret merchandise and several related books.

Critical response
US TV host Oprah Winfrey is a proponent of the book. On The Larry King Show she said that the message of The Secret is the message she's been trying to share with the world on her show for the past 21 years. Author Rhonda Byrne was later invited to her show along with people who swear by The Secret.

Valerie Frankel of Good Housekeeping wrote an article about her trying the principles of The Secret for four weeks. While she reached some of her goals, others had improved. Frankel's final assessment is: "Counting my blessings has been uplifting, reminding me of what's already great about my life. Visualization has forced me to pay attention to what I really desire. And laughing is never a bad idea. If you ignore The Secrets far-too-simplistic maxims (no, you will not be doomed to a miserable life for thinking negative thoughts) and the hocus-pocus (the cosmos isn't going to deliver a new car; it's busy), there's actually some helpful advice in the book. But it's nothing you don't already know."

In 2009, Barbara Ehrenreich published Bright-Sided: How the Relentless Promotion of Positive Thinking Has Undermined America as a reaction to self-help books such as The Secret, claiming that they promote political complacency and a failure to engage with reality.

Mark Manson, author of The Subtle Art of Not Giving a F*ck, is one of the harshest critics, writing that the book is "full of misplaced clichés, silly quotes, and superstitious drivel," and calls it a "playbook for entitlement and self-absorption," which "anybody who reads it and implements its advice ... will likely make themselves worse off in the long run."

John G. Stackhouse Jr. has provided historical context, locating Byrne's book in the tradition of New Thought and popular religion, and concluding that "it isn’t new, and it isn’t a secret".

Byrne's scientific claims, in particular concerning quantum physics, have been rejected by a range of authors including Christopher Chabris and Daniel Simons at The New York Times and Harvard physicist Lisa Randall. Mary Carmichael and Ben Radford, writing for the Center for Inquiry, have also pointed out that The Secret has no scientific foundation, stating that Byrne's book represents: "a time-worn trick of mixing banal truisms with magical thinking and presenting it as some sort of hidden knowledge: basically, it’s the new New Thought."

References

External links
 
 

2006 non-fiction books
Australian books
Philosophy of life
Self-help books
Quantum mysticism